is a Japanese modern pentathlete. He competed at the 1968 Summer Olympics in Mexico.

References

External links
 

1943 births
Living people
Japanese male modern pentathletes
Olympic modern pentathletes of Japan
Modern pentathletes at the 1968 Summer Olympics
People from Shimane Prefecture
20th-century Japanese people
21st-century Japanese people